Francisco de Orellana Canton is a canton of Ecuador, located in the Orellana Province.  Its capital is the town of Puerto Francisco de Orellana.  Its population at the 2001 census was 42,010.

Demographics
Ethnic groups as of the Ecuadorian census of 2010:
Mestizo  59.5%
Indigenous  26.7%
Afro-Ecuadorian  6.8%
White  5.1%
Montubio  1.7%
Other  0.3%

References

Cantons of Orellana Province